Punarjanmam is a 1972 Indian Malayalam-language erotic thriller film starring Prem Nazir and Jayabharathi. The film is directed by K. S. Sethumadhavan, based on a case study published by famous atheist and psychiatrist A. T. Kovoor in Mathrubhumi weekly. The film as well as Prem Nazir's performance won immense critical acclaim. The film was remade in Tamil as Maru Piravi with Muthuraman and Manjula in the lead roles and in Telugu as Vintha Katha starring Krishna and Vanisri. The film is considered to be the first erotic psychic thriller in Indian film history.

Plot 
Aravindan, a college lecturer, falls in love with his student Radha and marries her. However, the couple's sexual life is a failure, causing intense agony to Radha's father, Panikkar who is keen to have grandchildren. When all other means fail, Panikkar approaches a psychiatrist, who finds out that Aravindan's inability to have sex with Radha may have something to do with his intense affection for his mother, who had died just six months before Aravindan met Radha. How the doctor cajoles Radha into solving her husband's illness forms the climax.

Cast 
 Prem Nazir as Aravindan
 Jayabharathi as Radha
 Bahadoor as Kurup
 Adoor Bhasi as Narayana panikkar
 Sankaradi as Ashan
 Muthukulam Raghavan Pillai as Jyotsyan
 Paravoor Bharathan as college Principal
 Master Raghu as Young Aravindan
 Sujatha as Jaanu
 Prema Menon as Sankari
 Khadeeja as Ashan's wife

Soundtrack

Awards
 The film won Filmfare Award for Best Director - Malayalam received by K. S. Sethumadhavan (1972)

References

External links 
 

1972 films
1970s erotic thriller films
1970s Malayalam-language films
Indian erotic thriller films
Indian films based on actual events
Films based on non-fiction books
Malayalam films remade in other languages
Films directed by K. S. Sethumadhavan
Films with screenplays by Thoppil Bhasi